A King and Queen in Mourning is an oil on canvas painting by German artist Carl Friedrich Lessing, created in 1830, showing a royal couple mourning their daughter's death, a scene from Ludwig Uhland's poem Das Schloß am Meere. Considered the masterpiece of the "romantic-elegaic soul painting" of the Düsseldorf School, it is now in the Hermitage Museum in Saint Petersburg, Russia.

Bibliography
  Das trauernde Königspaar, 1830. In: Wend von Kalnein: Die Düsseldorfer Malerschule. Verlag Philipp von Zabern, Mainz 1979, pp. 389 f. (Katalog Nr. 155).
  Bettina Baumgärtel: Die Seelenmalerei und die neuen Helden der Geschichte. In: Bettina Baumgärtel (Hrsg.): Die Düsseldorfer Malerschule und ihre internationale Ausstrahlung 1819–1918. Michael Imhof Verlag, Petersberg 2011, vol. 2, pp. 160 f. (Katalog Nr. 124).

External links
  Das trauernde Königspaar, Datenblatt im Portal akg-images.de

References

History paintings
Paintings in the collection of the Hermitage Museum
1830 paintings
Paintings by Karl Friedrich Lessing
Adaptations of works by Ludwig Uhland